The Evil Within is a 2017 American horror film written and directed by Andrew Getty and starring Sean Patrick Flanery, Dina Meyer, Frederick Koehler, and Michael Berryman. It was originally titled The Storyteller. The film's conception and development was a personal project of Getty's, who largely self-financed it at the estimated cost of $4–6 million; production took fifteen years to complete. Following Getty's death in 2015, editing for the film was completed by producer Michael Luceri.

The film made its official premiere at the Fantasporto Film Festival on February 26, 2017, and was later acquired by Vision Films, who released it via Video on Demand on April 4, 2017. The Evil Within received mixed reviews from critics, who criticized the film's unevenness and dialogue while simultaneously commending it for its strangeness, and Getty's devotion to the material.

Plot 
Dennis Peterson is a man with a mental disability who has had nightmares all his life since he was a child, including one where he entered a carnival ride that seemed underwhelming. He is told that "the ride isn't over." As an adult, Dennis has a dream where a living demon, called "The Cadaver", fastens a zipper onto his back and enters his body. Also, in his dream, he finds a hidden room in the cellar that holds a full-length mirror that Dennis believes The Cadaver came from. The very next day, his brother John presents him with an identical mirror as a gift. He begins speaking to his reflection, who seems to answer back to him.

Dennis' brother John has difficulties of his own. His girlfriend, Lydia, demands that they get married but is upset that he will not do anything about Dennis. He is visited by Mildy Torres, a woman from social services, who believes that Dennis needs to be taken away after receiving an anonymous phone call where someone accused John of having trouble controlling his temper. This upsets John as he feels that Dennis is his responsibility. Dennis continues to have nightmares of The Cadaver, and his reflection informs him that in order to get rid of it, they need to start killing animals. He begins working in the secret cellar, which perplexes John, especially when he sees that Dennis has videos on taxidermy. Dennis says the videos are not his but were accidentally switched with another customer.

Once Dennis begins killing children, his reflection suddenly becomes a lot more articulate and reveals that "he" was the one giving Dennis the nightmares and that they still have more killing to do, much to Dennis' horror. Dennis meets with his crush, Susan, an employee at his favorite ice cream place. He tries to ask her out, but the conversation gets awkward, and Susan turns him down, hurting him. The Cadaver sends Dennis back to kill Susan, insisting that it is the only way to make her like him. Before he can reach her, she runs out into the street and is hit by a car, killing her. When John and Lydia take Dennis to his favorite restaurant, he spontaneously kills a man in the bathroom without hesitation, before returning to his senses and becoming horrified. Finally coming to the realization that his reflection is manipulating him for some sinister purpose, Dennis refuses to cooperate with it. Enraged by this, it continues to torment Dennis, creating illusions to frighten him as he struggles to stay awake. Eventually concluding there is no other way to stop The Cadaver, Dennis attempts to commit suicide by shooting himself with a gun he had hidden. Just as he's about to pull the trigger, Dennis is stopped by his reflection who emerges from the mirror and pushes Dennis in, allowing him to take control of Dennis' mind and body.

After a night out, John and Lydia discover they do not recognize anyone at places they regularly visit, implying that Dennis has killed most of the people in town. Mildy Torres arrives at the house with two police officers, but "Dennis" manages to kill them before he can be apprehended. While sitting at their favorite café, Lydia begins to question John and finally reveals the truth: Dennis was a child prodigy whose works had been published in the newspapers. One day during an argument, John punched Dennis, causing him to fall down the stairs. When Dennis awoke, his mental capabilities were severely diminished, and John has felt guilty ever since, motivating him to try to atone by caring for Dennis at the cost of his own happiness. Lydia sympathizes with John and accepts the idea that if she and John get married, Dennis will always live with them. She leaves to get Dennis so that they can share the happy news over dinner. John's friend Pete sits nearby and reveals that the taxidermy tapes are indeed Dennis'. John instructs Pete to call the police, and he hails a taxi.

Lydia arrives at the house and is fatally stabbed by Dennis. In the cellar, Dennis proceeds to mutilate Lydia's body and extract her organs. John arrives and enters the cellar, where he finds Dennis' gun and sits in a chair with a spotlight on it. Dennis appears with a now-stuffed Lydia and puts on a ventriloquist act, and John realizes he is glued to the chair. Dennis' other victims have all been stuffed and are used in an extravagant diorama revealing that when they were children, John felt extreme jealousy for all the attention Dennis received. One night, in a moment of extreme anger and resentment, he intentionally hit Dennis in the head with a baseball bat while he slept. Afterward, John fabricated the story about Dennis falling down the stairs to cover up his violent act. As more stuffed bodies are revealed, it becomes unclear if what John is seeing is actually happening. Overwhelmed by the grotesque visions, John shoots himself. Dennis is suddenly slammed down by the Cadaver-Spider hybrid he constructed, but it's revealed that he is actually being restrained by police officers who drag him away.

The final scene shows Dennis in a padded room. It is revealed that The Cadaver is still in control while the real Dennis is trapped deep in his own subconscious, unable to escape. All Dennis can do now is wait to have the dream where he can finally "get off the carnival ride".

Cast
 Frederick Koehler as Dennis Peterson
 Sean Patrick Flanery as John Peterson
 Dina Meyer as Lydia
 Michael Berryman as Cadaver
 Kim Darby as Mildy Torres
 Francis Guinan as Dr. Preston
 Brianna Brown as Susan
 Tim Bagley as Pete
 Matthew McGrory as Man at Preston's Table

Production
The Evil Within was inspired by the childhood nightmares of Getty. According to a post-production producer who had worked on the film and a friend of Getty, Ryan Readenour: "When he was young he would have these really powerful, sick, twisted dreams, and [they were] so shocking to him that he didn't think they came from him." Getty conceived the idea that it could be a storyteller who created these dreams, and The Storyteller was then used as the first title of the film. In a supplementary interview on the DVD release, Getty also stated he was inspired by the David Berkowitz Son of Sam killings, in which Berkowitz said he was ordered to kill by a demon taking the form of a talking dog. Getty postulated, what if there really was a demon giving the serial killer orders.

Filming began in 2002, and the film was shot largely in Getty's own mansion. He also converted one of the rooms in his mansion into a post-production suite. He made his own unique camera rigs, built expensive sets, and with his FX team he created elaborate animatronic robots, including an octopus that can play a drum kit. The production however would stop and start over many years as it was beset with funding issues and conflicts with the cast, including a lawsuit from a studio assistant. The cast and crew also went through a number of changes, and according to Koehler, only he and Michael Berryman made it through to the changes.

This was the final film to feature Matthew McGrory who appeared in an uncredited cameo from footage shot before his death in 2005.  The health conditions of both McGrory and Berryman (who had been ill for some years) had slowed down the production and scripted scenes had to be replaced.

Getty continued to work on the film for many years after the filming, creating his own special effects and trying to perfect the film. He died in 2015 before the film was finished, with the coloring and editing not completed. Producer Michael Luceri, who had also edited the film, finished the film.

Release
The Evil Within made its official premiere at the Fantasporto Film Festival on February 26, 2017. It was later screened at the Dead by Dawn Horror Film Festival on April 20 that same year. Amsterdamned Film Festival on October 27. That same day the film was alternately screened at the Morbido Film Festival as a part of its "New Blood" section.

Home media
The film was later acquired by Vision Films and released on April 4, 2017 on VOD services in North America such as Amazon under a new title, The Evil Within.

Critical reception
The Evil Within received mixed reviews from critics, with many critics noting the unevenness of the film. 
However, on Rotten Tomatoes, the film received a 100% approval rating based on five reviews. Most noted that in spite of its flaws, the movie succeeds in more ways than not. 
David Fontana of Film Inquiry thought that the film is "riddled with strange and unfocused plot-lines" and "filled with cringeworthy character acting", and that it "becomes so wrapped up in its own eccentricities that it is all but impossible to follow coherently". He nevertheless praised the film for its surreal visuals and special effects, and thought the "nuanced details" of the film "help to raise The Evil Within above its flaws", and that "it's hard to argue with that much [of Getty's] devotion to this singularly distinguished work of art". Charles Bramesco of The Guardian considered the film "very clearly the handiwork of a rank amateur under the influence of powerful narcotics", but that "Getty’s monomaniacal drive and technical knowhow resulted in some truly outré horror", and that his "wild experiments with the form command respect". Travis Johnson of Filmink criticized the film's dialogue, and felt that there were "no discernible reasons for scenes and interactions to exist at all", but still judged it "one of most singularly strange films to come along in a good while" and that it is a "remarkable cinematic artifact that is absolutely worth experiencing".

Andrew Todd from Birth.Movies.Death. gave the film a mostly positive review, stating that the film was 'far more elaborately crafted than one would expect'. Todd further noted that the film's perceived "faults" were actually its strengths, comparing the film to Marcin Wrona's final film Demon as "it's hard to watch without reading the director's psychological state and subsequent death into it." Andrew Marshall from Starburst Magazine rated the film a score of 7/10, while noting the film's "dubious" sub-plots and occasionally stilted dialogue, Marshall stated, "The Evil Within will not be for everyone, and as the years pass it's likely that the story of its prolonged production and tortured creator will become better known than the film itself, but one thing you can say for sure is that Andrew Getty has left his mark upon the world." Matt Boiselle from Dread Central awarded the film 3.5 out of 5 stars, writing, "Solid cast-work, a disquieting overall aura, and Matthew McGrory in one of his final on-screen appearances – it all adds up to a film that should be in your queue of midnight watches now."

See also
 List of films shot over three or more years

References

External links
 
 
 

2017 independent films
2017 films
2017 horror films
American independent films
American supernatural horror films
American direct-to-video films
Demons in film
2017 direct-to-video films
Direct-to-video horror films
American psychological horror films
Films scored by Mario Grigorov
2010s English-language films
2010s American films